Fiama Hasse Pais Brandão  (15 August 1938 – 19 January 2007) was a Portuguese poet, dramatist, translator and essayist.

Life 
Born in Lisbon, she lived in Carcavelos until the age of 18. She studied in St. Julian's School and in the University of Lisbon.
She worked as a theatre critic and translated works from German, English and French literature. She also did historical and literary research on the Portuguese 16th century.
In 1974, she was one of the founders of the "Teatro Hoje" theatre company.

Her first book, Em Cada Pedra Um Voo Imóvel, was published in 1958. In 1961 she participated in the collective publication Poesia 61, together with Gastão Cruz, Casimiro de Brito, Luiza Neto Jorge and Maria Teresa Horta.

Some of her most admired works appeared late in her life, including Epístolas e memorandos (1996) and Cenas vivas (2000). Both in 1996 and 2000, Fiama Hasse Pais Brandão was distinguished with the Portuguese Writers Association's Poetry Prize.

Works 

Poetry:

 Morfismos (1961)
 Barcas Novas (1967)
 Novas visões do passado (1975)
 Homenagemàliteratura (1976)
 F de Fiama (1986)
 Três Rostos (1989)
 Movimento Perpétuo (1992)
 Epístolas e Memorandos (1996)
 Cenas Vivas (2000)
 As Fábulas (2002)

Theatre:

 Os Chapéus de Chuva (1961)
 A Campanha (1965)
 Quem Move as Árvores (1979)
 Teatro-Teatro (1990)

Prose:

 Em Cada Pedra Um Voo Imóvel (1958)
 Movimento Perpétuo (1991)
 Sob o Olhar de Medeia (1998)

Essay:

 O Labirinto Camoniano e Outros Labirintos (1985)

English translations:

 In Contemporary Portuguese Poetry (Carcanet Press,1988)
 In Literary Olympians (USA,1997)
 In Anthology of Magazine Verse (USA, 1997)

Notes

External links 
 Poetry International Web  Short biography, some poetry and list of publications, including translated.

1938 births
2007 deaths
21st-century Portuguese poets
People from Lisbon
20th-century Portuguese poets
20th-century Portuguese women writers
Portuguese women poets
21st-century Portuguese women writers